Goli is a town in the Northern Region of Uganda.

History 
On 13 February 1965, Goli and Paidha were bombed by the Congolese Air Force in retaliation for the support of the Ugandan government for Simba rebels. The attack caused minimal damage.

Location
Goli is located in Nebbi District, West Nile sub-region, The town is at the international border with the Democratic Republic of the Congo. The coordinates of the town are:
2°23'14.0"N, 31°01'35.0"E (Latitude:2.387222; Longitude:31.026389).

Overview
The small town of Goli, Uganda is located on the main road between Arua on the Ugandan side and Bunia, the capital of Ituri Province in the DRC. In 2009, Goli was one of the locations of disagreements between Uganda and the DRC over their international border. The two countries selected a review commission to study the problem and report to the two governments.

Landmarks
The landmarks within the town limits or close to the edges of town include:

 The offices of Goli Town Council
 World Concern Medical Center - A rural health facility run by a missionary nurse
 Goli Central Market
 St. Stephen's Cathedral of the Church of Uganda, Nebbi Diocese

Photos
 Photos Taken Around Goli, Uganda in 2003

References

Works cited

External links
 Satellite Map of Goli, Uganda
 Firsthand Account of Working in Goli

Populated places in Northern Region, Uganda
Democratic Republic of the Congo–Uganda border crossings
Nebbi District
West Nile sub-region